Flora Coquerel (born 14 April 1994) is a French model and beauty pageant titleholder. She is the 85th Miss France titleholder. She represented France at Miss Universe 2015 where she placed in the Top 5, which represents the third highest French placement ever in Miss Universe. She is of French and Beninese descent.

Career

Miss Orléanais 2013
Coquerel won the title of Miss Orléanais 2013. She represented Orléanais (historical province of France) at Miss France 2014.

Miss France 2014
Coquerel was crowned as Miss France 2014 and represented the region of Orléanais at the pageant. After winning over Miss Guadeloupe, Miss Côte d'Azur, Miss Provence, and Miss Tahiti, respectively 4th, 3rd, 2nd and 1st runners-up, she received her crown from the previous Miss France, Marine Lorphelin. Some of the first statements she said to the journalists after winning the title were "Je suis fière de représenter une France cosmopolite, " meaning, "I'm honoured to represent a cosmopolitan France". During Miss France 2015, it was announced that Flora Coquerel was the tallest Miss France ever elected.

During her reign as Miss France 2014, Flora Coquerel has traveled to Italy, Panama, Benin, China, Polynesia, United Kingdom and Dominican Republic .

Miss World 2014
Coquerel was nominated as the France representative at Miss World 2014 which took place in London, England on 14 December 2014. She received the highest interview score and was in the top 20 at Miss Top Model and top 25 at "The People's Choice" in Miss World 2014. However, she failed to enter the Top 25 on the Finals night due to her late arrival in London because she attended the Miss France 2015 finals night on 6 December 2014.

Miss Universe 2015
Coquerel competed at the Miss Universe 2015 pageant in Las Vegas where she placed in the Top 5, ending 3rd Runner-up. This was only the second time a French woman was among the Top 5 delegates of the Miss Universe competition before Iris Mittenaere who was elected Miss Universe in Miss Universe 2016 ; the first one was Christiane Martel, who was elected Miss Universe in 1953.

References

External links

Miss France Official Website
Flora Coquerel on Instagram
Flora Coquerel on Twitter

1994 births
Living people
People from Mont-Saint-Aignan
Miss France winners
French people of Beninese descent
Miss World 2014 delegates
Miss Universe 2015 contestants